Cove is a remote hamlet located on the northwestern shore of the sea loch Loch Ewe, and  northwest of Poolewe in Ross-shire, Scottish Highlands and is in the Scottish council area of Highland.

Geography
Cove overlooks the Isle of Ewe on Loch Ewe to the southwest. The nearest major town is Ullapool, from where there are ferry sailings to the Outer Hebrides.

References

Populated places in Ross and Cromarty